The Cai–Long or Ta–Li languages are a group of Sino-Tibetan languages spoken in western Guizhou, China. Only Caijia is still spoken, while Longjia and Luren are extinct. The branch was first recognized by Chinese researchers in the 1980s, with the term Cai–Long first mentioned in Guizhou (1982: 43).

The languages are unclassified within Sino-Tibetan, and could be Sinitic or Tibeto-Burman.

Languages
The Cai–Long languages are:

Caijia
Longjia (extinct)
Luren (extinct)

Lexical innovations
Hölzl (2021) proposes the name Ta–Li as a portmanteau of the two lexical innovations ‘two’ and ‘pig’, respectively.

See also
List of unrecognized ethnic groups of Guizhou
Greater Bai comparative vocabulary list (Wiktionary)

References